Tommy Hughitt (born Ernest Fredrick Hughitt; December 27, 1892 – December 27, 1961) was a Canadian-American National Football League utility player, coach, referee and politician. He was also an All-American quarterback for the University of Michigan in 1913.

Early life
Hughitt was born in Genoa, British Columbia, but grew up in Escanaba, Michigan; his father, Orrin Hughitt, owned the hardware store in Escanaba. His high school football career in Escanaba was undistinguished, and Hughitt saw little playing time on his high school squad. Upon graduation he went to the University of Michigan, where he played halfback and then quarterback for the Wolverines.

Coaching career

From 1915 to 1916, Hughitt was the head football coach at the University of Maine. He compiled a 6–7–3 overall record, including the Maine Intercollegiate Athletic Association championship in 1915.  An article in The Michigan Technic commented on Hughitt's success at Maine:

Due to the excellent coaching of 'Tommy' Hughitt, former varsity quarterback, the University of Maine football team won the state championship this season.  Hughitt showed the effectiveness of the Yost system of coaching by developing a bunch of green material, a team which staged a real 'comeback' after a bad start last year.  Maine is highly pleased with the work of Hughitt and has engaged him for this season.

After experiencing a winless season in 1916, Hughitt left his coaching position in Maine and signed with the Youngstown Patricians of the Ohio League, turning professional as a player-coach. When the Patricians ceased operations due to the war and flu problems of 1918, Hughitt moved on to Buffalo Niagaras and Prospects of the Buffalo Semi-Pro Football League, returning to Youngstown in a brief and abortive attempt to relaunch the Patricians in 1919.

When the Prospects joined the ranks of the APFA (later known as the National Football League) in 1920, Hughitt was retained as the centerpiece of the now-renamed Buffalo All-Americans. During his APFA/NFL career, Hughitt was a triple threat man and player-coach at the same time, playing quarterback, wide receiver, running back, punter, placekicker, and playing on defense all the while coaching the team. He finished his career with an impressive 34–15–7 record, two state championships (1918 and 1919), two top-three finishes in the NFL (1920 and 1921), and statistically finishing at or near the top of the league in several scoring and receiving categories in 1920 and 1921 (the one-two punch of Hughitt and Ockie Anderson was one of the most potent in the nascent league); he never had a losing season in his entire time as a professional coach.

After football
He retired from football in 1924, shortly after acquiring a stake in his team. After Hughitt's departure, he handed over the reins of the franchise to Walter Koppisch, and Hughitt spent time as an official with the NFL and All-America Football Conference, during which he earned much respect. Buffalo sports historian Jeffrey J. Miller credits Hughitt for helping reintegrate black players in professional American football by strictly enforcing unsportsmanlike conduct penalties for fouls against black players that were clearly motivated by racism, during his time as a referee in the AAFC; Miller cites statements from Marion Motley, who played games that Hughitt had officiated, in support of this.

After his time in the NFL, Hughitt remained in the City of Buffalo and legally changed his name to "Tommy" for the purpose of making his name recognizable as he entered politics. In 1937, he served for a term of four years on the Buffalo Common Council, and at one point he unsuccessfully ran for the sheriff of Erie County. In the private sector, Hughitt ran a Ford dealership in the Buffalo area for many years. He died while on vacation in Bartow, Florida and was buried at Forest Lawn in Buffalo.  He was elected to Michigan's Upper Peninsula Sports Hall of Fame in 1992. However, despite his record, Hughitt has never been considered for the Pro Football Hall of Fame. He had a .694 winning percentage as a head coach, which ranks as the sixth highest for an NFL coach (he is second among coaches not inducted, next to Jim Harbaugh).  In 2022, he was named one of the 10 inaugural members for the Football Learning Academy's Hall of Honor, which looks to acknowledge deserving icons that are not currently inducted in the hall. Part of his overlooking came from the fact that the Hall of Fame had excluded persons with officiating experience until Art McNally was inducted in 2021.

Hughitt wore the number 1.

Head coaching record

College

Professional

See also
 1913 College Football All-America Team
 List of Michigan Wolverines football All-Americans

References

External links
 
 

1892 births
1961 deaths
20th-century American politicians
American football placekickers
American football punters
American football quarterbacks
American football running backs
Canadian players of American football
Buffalo All-Americans players
Buffalo Bisons (NFL) coaches
Buffalo Bisons (NFL) players
Maine Black Bears football coaches
New York Pro Football League players
Michigan Wolverines football players
National Football League officials
Youngstown Patricians players
Buffalo Common Council members
People from Escanaba, Michigan
Sportspeople from British Columbia
Players of American football from Buffalo, New York
Sportspeople from Buffalo, New York
Coaches of American football from Michigan
Players of American football from Michigan
Canadian emigrants to the United States